The  was a high-speed Shinkansen train type operated by East Japan Railway Company (JR East) in Japan from July 1994 until September 2012. They were the first double-deck trains built for Japan's Shinkansen. They were generally, along with their fellow double-deck class the E4 series, known by the marketing name "Max" (Multi-Amenity eXpress). The fleet was withdrawn from regular service on 28 September 2012.

Originally intended to be classified as 600 series, the E1 series trains were introduced specifically to relieve overcrowding on services used by commuters on the Tohoku Shinkansen and Joetsu Shinkansen.

Operations
E1 series sets were used on the following services.

 Joetsu Shinkansen 
 Max Asahi (July 1994 – November 2002)
 Max Tanigawa
 Max Toki (until 28 September 2012)
 Tohoku Shinkansen 
 Max Nasuno (until December 1999)
Max Yamabiko (July 1994 – December 1999)

Formation
The fleet of 12-car sets, numbered M1 to M6, were formed as follows, with car 1 at the Tokyo end.

Cars 6 and 10 were each equipped with a PS201 scissors-type pantograph.

Fleet details

(Sources:)

Interior
The E1 series was the first revenue-earning shinkansen to feature 3+3 abreast seating in standard class for increased seating capacity. The upper deck saloons of non-reserved cars 1 to 4 were arranged 3+3 with no individual armrests, and did not recline. The lower decks of these cars, and the reserved-seating saloons in cars 5 to 12 had regular 2+3 seating. The Green car saloons on the upper decks of cars 9 to 11 had 2+2 seating. The trains had a total seating capacity of 1,235 passengers.

Pre-refurbishment

Post-refurbishment

History

The first E1 series set, M1, was delivered to Sendai Depot on 3 March 1994, sporting "DDS E1" logos (DDS standing for double-deck shinkansen).
ローカル鉄道途中下車の旅 The first two E1 series sets delivered entered revenue-earning service on the Tohoku Shinkansen on 15 July 1994, with the original "DDS" logos replaced by "Max" logos. The original livery was "sky grey" on the upper body side and "silver grey" on the lower body side, separated by a "peacock green" stripe.

From 4 December 1999, all six trainsets were transferred from Sendai Depot to Niigata Depot, with operations limited to use on Joetsu Shinkansen Max Asahi and Max Tanigawa services only.

Refurbishment

From late 2003, the fleet underwent refurbishment, which included the installation of new seating and repainting in a new livery of "stratus white" on the upper body side and "aster blue" on the lower body side, separated by a "ibis pink" stripe.

All cars were made no-smoking from the start of the revised timetable on 18 March 2007.

Withdrawal

The first two sets were officially withdrawn in April 2012: M1 on 2 April, and M2 on 14 April. The remaining fleet was withdrawn from service from the start of the revised timetable on 29 September 2012.

A special  service ran from Niigata to Tokyo on 27 October 2012 using an E1 series set, followed by a final run from Tokyo to Niigata on 28 October 2012, using set M4.

Bodyside logos
Between 1 December 2001 and 31 March 2002, the E1 series fleet was adorned with "Alpen Super Express" logos as part of JR East's "JR + Snow" promotional campaign.

From mid August 2012 until the fleet's final withdrawal on 28 September, the remaining three sets had a second toki crested ibis added to their logos to celebrate the rare hatching of ibis chicks in the wild.

Preserved examples

One E1 series car is preserved: car E153-104 of set M4. This was moved to the Railway Museum in Saitama in December 2017, and is on display since spring 2018.

See also
 TGV Duplex, French double-deck high speed train
 List of high speed trains

References

External links

Shinkansen train series
East Japan Railway Company
Hitachi multiple units
Double-decker EMUs
25 kV AC multiple units
Kawasaki multiple units
Train-related introductions in 1994
Passenger trains running at least at 200 km/h in commercial operations
Double-decker high-speed trains